Charles Townsend Terry (February 26, 1835 – July 6, 1922) was an American politician in the state of Washington. He served in the Washington House of Representatives from 1895 to 1897.

References

Republican Party members of the Washington House of Representatives
1835 births
1922 deaths
People from Onondaga County, New York